Albion is a borough in Erie County, Pennsylvania, United States. The population was 1,516 at the 2010 census. It is part of the Erie Metropolitan Statistical Area. One of their main industries is the Albion State Correctional Institute (SCI Albion).

The town was ravaged by an F4 tornado that was part of the 1985 United States-Canada tornado outbreak on May 31, 1985.

Geography
Albion is located in southwestern Erie County and is surrounded by Conneaut Township.

U.S. Route 6N and Pennsylvania Route 18 pass through the center of Albion. US 6N leads east  to Edinboro and west then north  to West Springfield and Interstate 90. In the other direction, PA 18 leads south  to Conneaut Lake.

Demographics

As of the census of 2010, there were 1,616 people, 701 households, and 425 families residing in the borough. By 2020 the population is predicted to be around 1,700 people. The population density was 1,510.7 people per square mile (585.3/km²). There were 695 housing units at an average density of 653.4 per square mile (253.2/km²). The racial makeup of the borough was 98.38% White, 0.50% African American, 0.31% Native American, 0.37% Asian, 0.12% from other races, and 0.31% from two or more races. Hispanic or Latino of any race were 1.18% of the population.

There were 655 households, out of which 34.0% had children under the age of 18 living with them, 49.0% were married couples living together, 12.2% had a female householder with no husband present, and 35.0% were non-families. 30.2% of all households were made up of individuals, and 15.4% had someone living alone who was 65 years of age or older. The average household size was 2.45 and the average family size was 3.07.

In the borough the population was spread out, with 28.6% under the age of 18, 6.4% from 18 to 24, 30.4% from 25 to 44, 20.3% from 45 to 64, and 14.2% who were 65 years of age or older. The median age was 35 years. For every 100 females there were 87.3 males. For every 100 females age 18 and over, there were 82.1 males.

The median income for a household in the borough was $33,007, and the median income for a family was $40,650. Males had a median income of $31,620 versus $21,157 for females. The per capita income for the borough was $15,361. About 10.6% of families and 11.8% of the population were below the poverty line, including 14.2% of those under age 18 and 13.4% of those age 65 or over.

Education
Albion is part of the Northwestern School District. The borough has four schools in total. There is the Northwestern Elementary School, the Springfield Elementary School, the Northwestern Middle School, and the Northwestern High School. The team mascot for all four schools  is the Northwestern Wildcat, "Willie."

Sports
The Northwestern School District has teams for baseball, softball, volleyball, track and field, cross country, basketball, wrestling and football. The Northwestern Wildcats football teams play their home games at Rogers Field, which is located beside the high school. Youth sports in Albion include Northwestern Little League (baseball and softball) and Northwest Little Gridders Football.

Nicknames
Albion is "the most northwestern borough in Pennsylvania" and is home to "the most northwestern high school in Pennsylvania", which is fitting due to the fact that their high school is called Northwestern.

Albion contains Conneaut Creek and two of its tributaries. Therefore, anglers sometimes refer to Albion as "The country's best trout fishery", due to Conneaut Creek being called that.

Transportation
U.S. Route 6N and State Route 18 pass through Albion.

The Bessemer and Lake Erie Railroad passes through Albion on its way to the P & C Dock Company in Conneaut, Ohio.

Notable people
 Walter Dobrogosz (born 1933 in Albion), microbiologist
 David Lohr (born 1974), crime journalist for Discovery Communications, truTV and AOL

References

External links

Populated places established in 1797
Boroughs in Erie County, Pennsylvania